Frederick Hamilton may refer to:

Frederick Hamilton (soldier) (1590–1647), Irish soldier of Scottish descent
Frederick Hamilton (Londonderry politician) (1650–1732), Irish MP for Coleraine
Frederick Hamilton (Donegal politician) (c. 1663–1715), Irish MP for Donegal County
Frederick Hamilton (Archdeacon of Raphoe) (1728–1811), Anglican priest
Frederick William Hamilton (1815–1890), British Army officer
Frederick Hamilton-Temple-Blackwood, 1st Marquess of Dufferin and Ava (1826–1902), Governor General of Canada and Viceroy of India
Lord Frederick Spencer Hamilton (1856–1928), British MP for South West Manchester and North Tyrone
Frederick Hamilton (Royal Navy officer) (1856–1917), British admiral
Frederick W. Hamilton (1860–1940), US businessman and president of Tufts University
Frederick Orton Hamilton (1873–1945), New Zealand wool, grain, and produce and general merchant
Frederick Hamilton-Temple-Blackwood, 3rd Marquess of Dufferin and Ava (1875–1930), British soldier and Senator of the Northern Ireland Parliament
Frederick Dalrymple-Hamilton (1890–1974), British admiral
Frederic C. Hamilton (1927–2016), chairman of the Hamilton Companies LLC

See also
Fred Hamilton (disambiguation)